Olga Feliú Segovia (20 August 1932 – 25 June 2017) was a Chilean politician and lawyer. She was appointed to the Senate in 1990 by the Supreme Court and served until 1998, when she was succeeded by Enrique Silva Cimma.

References

1932 births
2017 deaths
20th-century Chilean women politicians
20th-century Chilean politicians
Members of the Senate of Chile
Chilean women lawyers
Politicians from Santiago
Women members of the Senate of Chile
20th-century Chilean lawyers
21st-century Chilean lawyers
20th-century women lawyers
21st-century women lawyers